Littlelot is an unincorporated community in Hickman County, Tennessee, United States.

Littlelot was named for its diminutive size when a founder declared: "It is such a damn little lot, we can't give it a big name".

References

Unincorporated communities in Hickman County, Tennessee
Unincorporated communities in Tennessee